Rail India Technical and Economic Service Limited, abbreviated as RITES Ltd, is an Indian public sector undertaking and engineering consultancy corporation, specializing in the field of transport infrastructure. Established in 1974 by the Indian Railways, the company's initial charter was to provide consultancy services in rail transport management to operators in India and abroad. RITES has since diversified into planning and consulting services for other infrastructure, including airports, ports, highways and urban planning. On-shore WDS6 Diesel Loco Leasing service has been introduced. It was awarded the status of Miniratna in 2002.

It has executed projects in over 62 countries on every major continent. As of 2011, it was executing projects in over 55 countries.

The company got listed on both the major stock exchanges in India on July, 2018.

Railway projects
Major railway companies and projects that have had projects with RITES as a consultant include:
 SNTF, Algeria, Consulting
 Luanda Railway (CFL), Angola, Feasibility study for rehabilitation
 Bangladesh Railway, Bangladesh, Consultation
 Belize Railways, Belize, Planning
 Belmopan Commuter Rail, Belize, Planning
 Botswana Railways, Botswana, Management Support and Consultation
 Cambodian Railways, Cambodia, Rehabilitation
 Red Atlantic Railway Network, Colombia, Equity partner, Technical and Managerial support
 Ghana Railway Corporation, Ghana, Consultation
 Iran Railways, Iran, Planning
 Iraqi Republic Railways, Operation and Maintenance of Baghdad – Al Qaim – Akashat Section. 
 Railways of Jamaica
 Kenya Railways, Kenya,  Locomotive operation, Restructuring, Planning
 Central East African Railways, Malawi,  Management services. 
 Beira Railroad Corporation (CFM Central), Mozambique, Rehabilitation and Management
 Nicaraguan Railways, Nicaragua, Planning
 Nigerian Railways, Nigeria, Complete management (3 years), Revitalization, Planning
 Philippine Railways, Philippines, Rehabilitation
 Sri Lanka Railways, Sri Lanka, Consulting and Management assistance
 Sudan Railways, Sudan, Consulting
 Tanzania Railway Corporation, Tanzania, General management
 Uzbek Railways, Uzbekistan, Expert based consultancy for Elastic Fasteners and Accounting System project
 Zambian Railways, Zambia, Improvement project
 National Railways of Zimbabwe, Zimbabwe, Investment plan
 Bangalore Metro Rail Corporation, As a lead partner to General Consultants.
 Bogibeel Bridge at Dibrugarh, as Design Consultants.
 Patna Metro, for preparing its DPR Detailed Project Report.
 Gorakhpur Metro, for preparing its DPR Detailed Project Report.
 Nagpur Metro, As a partner in the consortium of General Consultants.
 Ahmedabad Metro.
 National High Speed Rail Corporation Limited (NHSRCL).
 Mumbai Metro Line 3 (Colaba – Bandra – Seepz Metro)

References

External links 
 
 RITES Ltd. on Twitter
 Rites journal, July

Railway companies of India
Government-owned companies of India
Engineering consulting firms
1974 establishments in Haryana
Indian companies established in 1974
Companies listed on the National Stock Exchange of India
Companies listed on the Bombay Stock Exchange